Marshall Paul Noyes (October 13, 1870 – September 6, 1946) was an American football player and coach.  He served as the first head football coach at Northwestern University, coaching one season in 1893 and compiling a record of 2–5–3.

Head coaching record

References

External links
 

1870 births
1946 deaths
19th-century players of American football
Northwestern Wildcats football coaches
Northwestern Wildcats football players
Northwestern University Pritzker School of Law alumni
Yale University alumni
Sportspeople from Evanston, Illinois
Players of American football from Illinois
Illinois lawyers